Pyrotechnics is the science and craft of creating such things as fireworks, safety matches, oxygen candles, explosive bolts and other fasteners, parts of automotive airbags, as well as gas-pressure blasting in mining, quarrying, and demolition. This trade relies upon self-contained and self-sustained exothermic chemical reactions to make heat, light, gas, smoke and/or sound. The name comes from the Greek words pyr ("fire") and tekhnikos ("made by art").

People responsible for the safe storage, handling, and functioning of pyrotechnic devices are known as pyrotechnicians.

Proximate pyrotechnics
Explosions, flashes, smoke, flames, fireworks and other pyrotechnic-driven effects used in the entertainment industry are referred to as proximate pyrotechnics. Proximate refers to the pyrotechnic device's location relative to an audience. In the majority of jurisdictions, special training and licensing must be obtained from local authorities to legally prepare and use proximate pyrotechnics.

Many musical groups use pyrotechnics to enhance their live shows. Pink Floyd were innovators of pyrotechnic use in concerts. For instance, at the climax of their song "Careful with That Axe, Eugene", a blast of smoke was set off at the back of the stage. Bands such as the Who, KISS and Queen soon followed with use of pyrotechnics in their shows. Michael Jackson attempted using pyrotechnics in a 1984 Pepsi advertisement, where a stray spark caused a small fire in his hair. German industrial metal band Rammstein are renowned for their incorporation of a large variety of pyrotechnics into performances, which range from flaming costumes to face-mounted flamethrowers. Nightwish, Lordi, Sabaton and Green Day are also known for their vivid pyrotechnics in concert. Many professional wrestlers have also used pyrotechnics as part of their entrances to the ring.

Modern pyrotechnics are, in general, divided into categories based upon the type of effect produced or manufacturing method. The most common categories are:

Airbust - Hanging charges designed to burst into spheres of sparks.
Binary powders - Kits divided into separate oxidizer and fuel, intended to be mixed on site.
Bullet hit squib - A small, electrically initiated device simulating gunshot wounds.
Comet (meteor) - Brightly colored burning pellets resembling shooting stars.
Mine - Tubes containing a lift charge intended to project stars, sparks, confetti or streamers.
Preloaded Smoke Pot - Cartridges designed to release a mushroom cloud of smoke.
Concussion (cannon simulator, concussion tube) - Device designed to create a loud report.
Falls - Propellant with titanium burning in an open ended tube creating a falling spark effect.
Fireballs / Mortar Hits - Short barreled device projecting smoky rolling ball of flame.
Flame Projector - Tube containing nitrocellulose granules that burn in pillars of colored flame.
Flare (Torch) - Short, high intensity flames or various colours.
Flash Cotton (Sparkle String) - Nitrated cotton string(nitrocellulose).
Flashpaper - Sheets of nitrated paper (nitrocellulose) resembling tissue paper.
Flash Pot - Short metal pot used with binary powders creating flash, smoke or sparks.
Flash Tray (split mine) - A long tube slit down one side to project a sheet of flash.
Gerb (including fountain, whistle, and waterfall) - A fountain of sparks.
Lance - A Small colored flare tube used in making points of light lancework or pictures in fire.
Line Rockets - Whistling or colored rocket devices that travel along guide cables.
Multi-Tube Article (multi-shot plate, multiple shot repeater boards and bombardo boards; designed to function in sequence) - Multiple effects chained together.
Pre-Mixed Powder - Powders intended to create various effects. (Concussions, flashes, etc.)
Strobe - A brightly colored magnesium fueled flare blinking with repetitive flashes.
Wheel (Saxon) - Tubes that create a spinning wheel of sparks.

A basic theatrical effect, designed to create a jet or fountain of sparks, is referred to as a gerb. A gerb consists of a sufficiently strong and non-flammable container to hold the pyrotechnic compound. Typical pyrotechnic formulations consist either of flammable materials such as nitrocellulose and/or black powder or a mixture of a fuel and oxidizer blended in situ. A plug placed at one end of the container with a small orifice, called a choke, constricts the expulsion of the ignited pyrotechnic compound, increasing the size and aggressiveness of the jet.

Various ingredients may be added to pyrotechnic devices to provide colour, smoke, noise or sparks. Special additives and construction methods are used to modify the character of the effect produced, either to enhance or subdue the effect; for example, sandwiching layers of pyrotechnic compounds containing potassium perchlorate, sodium salicylate or sodium benzoate with layers that do not creates a fountain of sparks with an undulating whistle.

In general, such pyrotechnic devices are initiated by a remotely controlled electrical signal that causes an electric match, or e-match, to produce ignition. The remote control may be manual, via a switch console, or computer controlled according to a pre-programmed sequence and/or a sequence that tracks the live performance via stage cues.

Display pyrotechnics

Display pyrotechnics, also known as commercial fireworks, are pyrotechnic devices intended for use outdoors, where the audience can be further away, and smoke and fallout is less of a concern. Generally the effects, though often similar to proximate pyrotechnics, are of a larger size and more vigorous in nature. It will typically take an entire day to set up a professional fireworks display. This work is normally undertaken on temporarily secured locations by specialist companies employing teams of experienced pyrotechnicians.

In modern times a familiar feature of larger fireworks displays are aerial shells, which commonly appear as large spherical bursts of stars in the sky. The exterior of these shells are commonly made of a hard paper-adhesive layered composite which holds the interior stars arranged around a burst charge, or other pyrotechnic effects. Aerial shells are fired out of mortars from the ground and have internal timing fuses that accurately and reliably position their bursts. A continuous sequence of shells are launched, often with effects artistically choreographed to music and themes, accompanied by various types of ground effects. Modern fireworks displays are commonly executed to a designed program using electrical wiring and ignition linked to an electronic firing system. 

The size of these fireworks can range from 50 mm (2") to over 600 mm (24") diameter depending on the type of effect and available distance from the audience. In most jurisdictions, special fireworks training and licensing must be obtained from local authorities to legally prepare and use display pyrotechnics.

Consumer pyrotechnics
Consumer pyrotechnics are devices readily available for purchase to the general public with little or no special licensing or training. These items are considered relatively low hazard devices but, like all pyrotechnics, can still be hazardous and should be stored, handled and used appropriately. Some of the most common examples of consumer pyrotechnics encountered include recreational fireworks (including whistling and sparking types), model rocket motors, highway and marine distress flares, sparklers and caps for toy guns. Pyrotechnics are also indirectly involved in other consumer products such as powder actuated nail guns, ammunition for firearms, and modern fireplaces. Some types, including bird scarers, shell crackers, whistle crackers and flares, may be designed to be fired from a 12-gauge pistol or rifle.

Safety
Pyrotechnics are dangerous and must be handled and used properly. Recently, several high-profile incidents involving pyrotechnics have re-enforced the need to respect these explosives at all times. Proximate pyrotechnics is an area of expertise that requires additional training beyond that of other professional pyrotechnics areas and the use of devices specifically manufactured for indoor, close proximity use.

Homemade devices

A common low-budget pyrotechnic flash pot is built using modified screw-in electric fuses in a common light fixture. The fuses are intentionally blown, acting as ignitors for a pyrotechnic material.

Homemade devices may fail to include safety features and can provide numerous hazards, including:

A firing circuit using high-power, non-isolated AC line voltage can be a shock hazard to the operator and bystanders.
The use of high-current fuses as ignitors can cause main circuit breakers and fuses to trip, due to the sudden inrush of hundreds of amperes through a dead-shorted circuit. Switches used to control ignition may be damaged from the high-current surges.
There may not be indicators or interlocks preventing premature ignition of the pyrotechnic material. Screwing a powder-loaded fuse into an unknowingly powered socket will result in immediate ignition, injuring the operator.

Commercial flash pots include safety features such as warning pilot lamps, preignition grounding, and safing circuits. They also use isolated and low-voltage power sources, and have keyed power connections to help prevent accidental ignition.

Pyrotechnic incidents

Pyrotechnics can be dangerous substances that must always be treated with the utmost respect and with the proper training. Due to the hazardous nature of these materials, precautions must always be taken to ensure the safety of all individuals in the vicinity of pyrotechnics. Despite all precautions, accidents and errors occur from time to time, which may result in property damage, injury and in severe cases loss of life. These incidents may be the result of poorly manufactured product, unexpected or unforeseen events, or in many cases, the result of operator error.

Some of the more widely publicized incidents involving pyrotechnics in recent history include:

In 1982, a pyrotechnic special effects accident during the filming of Twilight Zone: The Movie killed actor Vic Morrow and two children and injured six members of the film crew. The accident and subsequent trial prompted new safety standards, procedures and regulations to the use of pyrotechnics in the motion picture and television industry.

At Olympic Stadium in Montreal during the Guns N' Roses/Metallica Stadium Tour on August 8, 1992, Metallica frontman James Hetfield was the victim of a severe pyrotechnics accident during the song "Fade to Black", in which a pyrotechnic charge exploded. Hetfield's guitar protected him from the full force of the blast; however, the fire engulfed his left side, burning his left hand, both arms, eyebrows, face and hair. He suffered second and third-degree burns, but was back on stage 17 days later.

In 2003, improper use of pyrotechnics caused a fire in a Rhode Island nightclub called The Station. The Station nightclub fire was started when fireworks used by the band Great White accidentally ignited flammable soundproofing foam. The pyrotechnics in question were not appropriate. The foam caused combustion to spread rapidly and the resulting fire led to 100 deaths, apparently because their quick escape was blocked by ineffective exit doors. While the type of foam used and the lack of a sprinkler system were important factors in the fire, the Great White fire could likely have been prevented had those involved paid attention to standard safety practices around the use of pyrotechnics.

A similar pyrotechnic-induced fire in 2004 destroyed the Republica Cromagnon nightclub in Buenos Aires, Argentina, killing 194 people.

In May 2000, a small fire led to two massive explosions at the SE Fireworks Depot in Enschede, the Netherlands, leaving 23 people dead, 947 people injured, and an estimated 2,000 homes damaged or destroyed.

In March 2008, a pyrotechnic lead cable snapped during the end of the show pyrotechnics, causing some minor burns and injuries to the crowd at WWE Wrestlemania 24 leading to a big investigation.

In February 2010 at the Elimination Chamber PPV, a pyrotechnic flame engulfed WWE wrestler The Undertaker. He was seen with multiple burns throughout the show, but managed to go ahead with the match after pouring bottles over himself.

In July 2011, Rihanna's performance of "California King Bed" was forced to be the finale of her show during the Loud Tour in Dallas as a fire broke out from the pyrotechnics having caused a small fire above where Rihanna had been performing. Because of this, the show ended early.

In July 2012, a WWE RAW pyrotechnic rehearsal caused a small fire on the LED wall before doors opened. Crews put it out before it could get any bigger. No one was injured but the doors were opened thirty minutes late.

On January 27, 2013, at the "Kiss" nightclub in Santa Maria, Brazil, an accident due to the use of pyrotechnics by the performing live show band caused a fire which resulted in the deaths of at least 236 people, while dozens suffered serious injuries from the fire and smoke inhalation.

In January 2015 a fireworks factory in Granada, Colombia exploded injuring one person.

On June 13, 2015, Michael Clifford of 5 Seconds of Summer suffered face, hair, and shoulder injuries from a pyrotechnics accident on the Rock Out With Your Socks Out Tour at the SSE Wembley Arena, London. Calum Hood suffered a minor burn on his arm in the incident.

On October 30, 2015, at the Colectiv nightclub in Bucharest, Romania, pyrotechnics used by the band Goodbye to Gravity accidentally ignited soundproofing foam on a pillow. The fire quickly spread onto the ceiling and the rest of the club. This led to the death of 64 people and injured approximately 200 others. Four members of Goodbye to Gravity lost their lives, and only their soloist survived. It remains the worst night club fire in Romania's history.

2 September 2019: Joana Sainz García, Spanish singer and dancer of Super Hollywood Orchestra, died in Las Berlanas, Spain when a pyrotechnic was shot in the wrong direction during the on-stage explosion.

On May 1, 2020, pyrotechnics caused damage to a factory in Zürich, an investigation into the cause of the incident is underway.

On September 5, 2020, a "smoke generating pyrotechnic device" caused a wildfire in Yucaipa, California during a gender-reveal party in El Dorado Ranch Park. The California Department of Forestry and Fire Prevention did not give out any more details regarding the party.

See also

Fireworks
List of nightclub fires

Notes

References
Natural Resources Canada (2003), "Pyrotechnics Special Effects Manual. Edition 2" Minister of Public Works and Government Services Canada
NFPA (2006), "NFPA 160; Standard for Flame Effects Before an Audience" NFPA International
NFPA (2006), "NFPA 1123; Code for Fireworks Display" NFPA International
NFPA (2006), "NFPA 1126; Standard for the Use of Pyrotechnics before a Proximate Audience" NFPA International

External links

Explosives Safety and Security Branch; a division of Natural resources Canada.
Canadian Fireworks Association ACP
PGI.org – Pyrotechnics Guild International
PyroGuide – pyrotechnics wiki
Film Pyrotechnics  Pyrotechnic film examples

 
Explosives
Special effects
Hobbies